The Bledsoe County Correctional Complex is a state prison in Pikeville, Bledsoe County, Tennessee, owned and operated by the Tennessee Department of Corrections.  

The facility opened in 2013.  As an intake and diagnostic facility, Bledsoe County houses a mix of inmate security levels:  300 minimum security beds, 1024 medium, 192 close, and 24 maximum security, for a total capacity of 1540.  

The only access to the $208 million complex of 23 buildings is an entry tunnel, allowing an uninterrupted perimeter fence.  Individual pre-cast cells, of 80 square feet, were fully assembled off-site and then stacked by crane.  The architects were the DLR Group.

The former Southeastern Tennessee State Regional Correctional Facility, built in 1980 with 971 beds, stands intact immediately adjacent to the new facility.  It was re-designated as the BCCC Annex.  Neither facility should be confused with the Bledsoe County Detention Center on Allen Deakins Road, which opened in 2011 as a county jail.

Notable inmates
Notable criminals incarcerated at the facility include:
Letalvis Cobbins – convicted of the 2007 kidnapping, rape, and murders of Channon Christian and Christopher Newsom
Travis Reinking – convicted of the Nashville Waffle House shooting
George Geovonni Thomas – convicted of the 2007 kidnapping, rape, and murders of Channon Christian and Christopher Newsom

References 

Prisons in Tennessee
Buildings and structures in Bledsoe County, Tennessee
2013 establishments in Tennessee